Frankie Delgado (born May 30, 1981) is a Mexican-American actor, producer and television personality. He is known for appearing on the reality television series, The Hills.

Career 
Delgado first appeared in twentyfourseven, a 2006 MTV television series. In 2007 he began appearing on The Hills, another MTV series, in a total of 41 episodes.

He has also briefly appeared on the series, Keeping Up with the Kardashians, Bromance and Vai Anitta.

As of October 2016, Delgado has collaborated with several night clubs and lounges in Los Angeles and Las Vegas.

In 2017, he participated as an actor and producer in the horror film, Del Playa, loosely based on the events of the 2014 Isla Vista massacre.

At the 2018 MTV Video Music Awards, MTV announced a reboot of The Hills entitled The Hills: New Beginnings, which premiered in 2019. Delgado was announced as part of the cast of the new series.

Personal life 
Delgado married Jennifer Acosta in June 2013, after getting engaged to her in 2012; the couple met in summer 2009. Their daughter, Isabella Amalia, was born on May 4, 2014. Their son, Francis Franco, was born on December 16, 2016. Their second son, River Patrick, was born on July 2, 2022.

Filmography

As actor

As himself

As producer

References

External links

American reality television producers
American television personalities
American people of Mexican descent
Living people
1981 births